The 24 Hours of Le Mans is an annual 24-hour automobile endurance race organised by the automotive group Automobile Club de l'Ouest (ACO) and held on the Circuit de la Sarthe race track close to the city of Le Mans, the capital of the French department of Sarthe. Each overall victor is presented with a trophy bearing the event's emblem and the logo of the ACO commissioned by the sporting director Jean-Pierre Moreau in 1993. All three-time consecutive winning manufacturers permanently keep the trophy. Since 1991, at the initiative of a man named Bernard Warain, a cast of the winning driver's feet, hands and signature are taken before the following year's race and put in a bronze car-wheel shaped plaque that is placed into the pavement in Le Mans' Saint Nicholas district.

Tom Kristensen has won the event nine times, more than any other competitor. Jacky Ickx, the previous record holder, is second with six victories, and Derek Bell, Frank Biela and Emanuele Pirro are third with five wins each. Hurley Haywood had the longest wait between his first Le Mans win and his last. Alexander Wurz waited the longest between his inaugural victory at the  event and his second win—following 12 years, 11 months, 29 days later—at the  edition. Luigi Chinetti is the oldest Le Mans winner; he was 47 years, 11 months and 9 days old when he won the  event. Wurz is the event's youngest winner; he was 22 years, 4 months and 1 day old when he won the 1996 race. There have been a record 33 victors from the United Kingdom, followed by France with 29 and Germany with 19. A total of four countries have produced just one winner.

Audi are second with 13 wins and Ferrari are third with 9 victories. German manufacturers have won a record 34 times amongst four constructors, followed by the United Kingdom with 17 victories amongst 6 manufacturers and France with 15 wins amongst 9 constructors. Joest Racing are the most successful race team with 13 victories and the Audi R8 is the best race-winning vehicle with five victories.

 there have been 140 victorious drivers from 20 individual countries and 25 winning manufacturers representing 7 different nations in the race's 90 editions. The first two winners were André Lagache and René Léonard in 1923, and the most recent driver to achieve his first victory was Ryō Hirakawa in 2022. Most years until 1985 saw two drivers per entry win before three participants per car became the norm from 1985 onwards.

Winners

Statistics

By driver

By nationality

By manufacturer

By team

Notes

References

Bibliography

External links
 

Auto racing lists
Winners

fr:24 Heures du Mans#Palmarès